R U the Girl (also known as R U the Girl with T-Boz and Chilli) is an American reality television music competition series that aired on UPN in 2005. The series featured Tionne "T-Boz" Watkins and Rozonda "Chilli" Thomas, the remaining members of the all-girl R&B group TLC whose former member, Lisa "Left Eye" Lopes, died in a car crash in Honduras in 2002. Initially promoted by the network as a contest to replace Lopes 3 years after her death, both Watkins and Thomas clarified that the winner of the contest would not be joining TLC full-time and would not be a full-time replacement member; the winner would only provide guest vocals on a new single by the duo.

Synopsis
On June 25, 2004, Tionne Watkins and Rozonda Thomas announced that they were pitching a reality television show that was eventually picked up for development by UPN. The casting tour for the series began on February 5, 2005 in Los Angeles, with tour stops in New York City, Chicago, Dallas, Washington, D.C., Atlanta, and Miami. After the semifinalists were selected, they were each judged on their ability to sing by Watkins and Thomas. Filming for the main episodes concluded on April 26, 2005

The program aired nine episodes, with seven episodes being the main episodes, the eighth episode being an overview of the series and original TLC home videos, and the ninth being the series finale. The episodes' names are also puns based on TLC's songs. The finale episode was aired live and featured the final two contestants O'so Krispie and Mirrah Fay-Parker. Krispie (Tiffany Baker), a 20-year-old choreographer from Atlanta, was ultimately chosen as the winner and performed the single "I Bet" with Watkins and Thomas on the series finale.

Episodes

"I Bet"

"I Bet" is a song by American girl group TLC. It was written by band members Tionne "T-Boz" Watkins and Rozonda "Chilli" Thomas along with Rico Love and Melvin "Saint Nick" Coleman, with production helmed by the latter. The uptempo track features rapper O'so Krispie, the winner of R U the Girl, a 2005 UPN reality show whose purpose was to find a singer that would record a song with TLC.

Before Krispie was announced as the winner of the show, she and fellow finalist and eventual runner up Mirrah Fay-Parker each recorded separate versions of the song, each contributing backing vocals and a rap that they had composed themselves. However, despite the Krispie version being released as a single, Krispie's songwriting contributions are uncredited on the single.

The resulting track was titled "I Bet," which was commercially released as a single in October 2005. The physical CD single sold 2,000 units in the United States, according to Nielsen SoundScan, while the digital download of the song has moved over 4,000. The record was later added to the digital reissue of TLC's compilation album Now & Forever: The Hits.

Track listing 
Digital download
"I Bet" – 3:23

Credits and personnel
Credits adapted from the liner notes of Now & Forever: The Hits.

Songwriting – Richard Butler, Melvin Coleman, Rozonda Thomas, Tionne Watkins, O'so Krispie (uncredited)
Production – Melvin "Saint Nick" Coleman
Mixing – Leslie Brathwaite, Carlton Lynn 
Engineering – Kori Anders, Wyatt Coleman 
Mastering – Chaz Harper

References

External links
 

2005 singles
Songs written by Rico Love
TLC (group) songs
Songs written by Tionne Watkins
Arista Records singles
2003 songs
Songs written by Rozonda Thomas
2005 American television series debuts
2005 American television series endings
2000s American reality television series
2000s American music television series
English-language television shows
Singing talent shows
TLC (group)
UPN original programming
African-American reality television series